Reg Carr (3 October 1934 – 20 October 2011) was an Australian rules footballer who played with Fitzroy in the Victorian Football League (VFL).

Notes

External links 		
		
		
		
		
		
		
1934 births		
2011 deaths		
Australian rules footballers from Victoria (Australia)		
Fitzroy Football Club players